Drive eO is an engineering company which operates from Latvia and specializes in development of electric and hybrid electric prototype vehicles for demanding applications. It was founded in 2011 to create the first ever hybrid electric rally car OSCar eO for the 2012 Dakar Rally.

The company went on to develop a number of electric racing cars for participation at the Pikes Peak International Hill Climb. In 2015, the one-megawatt eO PP03 race car driven by Rhys Millen set a new EV record and became the first ever all-electric vehicle to win the event overall.

OSCar eO 

The car is based on the platform of all wheel drive OSCar O3 rally raid car manufactured by OSC. It features a series hybrid drivetrain. Drive eO gives the following vehicle specification:

OSCar eO has participated at three international rally raids:

eO PP01 

The car features an all wheel drive electric drivetrain with one inboard mounted direct drive motor per wheel. It is based on a tubular spaceframe chassis with bodywork derived from Aquila CR1 racing car. Drive eO gives the following vehicle specification:

The car was driven at the 2013 Pikes Peak International Hill Climb by Latvian and Baltic touring car champion Jānis Horeliks. The adverse weather conditions had made the track surface slippery and he went off-road after losing grip in a left hand corner at the Halfway Picnic Grounds. A documentary called "Uzvaras cena" has been produced about the project and was first aired in September 2013 on LTV7 during motoring programme "Tavs auto".

eO PP02 

Drive eO returned to the Pikes Peak International Hill Climb in 2014 with a race car based on a Tesla Roadster chassis. This was the first time that Tesla brand was represented at a major international motorsport event. The original chassis was retained but the entire drive train was replaced by Drive eO to validate the new components ahead of scaling them up for successive electric supercar projects. The car was again piloted by Janis Horeliks and he completed the course in 12 minutes and 57.536 seconds to rank fifth in the Electric Modified division.

Drive eO gives the following vehicle specification:

eO PP03

As the next step, Drive eO developed an entirely new vehicle eO PP03 for the 93rd running of Pikes Peak International Hill Climb on June 28, 2015. The vehicle featured a one-megawatt electric drive train and all-wheel drive transmission. The team signed Rhys Millen to drive the car and was aiming for overall victory.

On the race day Rhys Millen completed the course in 9 minutes and 7.222 seconds, setting a new EV record and becoming the overall winner.

eO PP100
In 2016, the car had Peak power  and peak torque 2520 Nm, with a weight of 1200 kg. Millen set a record of 8:57.118.

References

External links 

Dakar Rally website
Pikes Peak International Hill Climb website

Companies established in 2011
Latvian brands
Electric vehicle manufacturers of Latvia
Hybrid vehicles